The following is a list of All-American Girls Professional Baseball League players who formed part of the circuit  during its twelve years of existence.

See also
 List of All-American Girls Professional Baseball League players (A–C)
 List of All-American Girls Professional Baseball League players (D–G)
 List of All-American Girls Professional Baseball League players (M–R)
 List of All-American Girls Professional Baseball League players (S–Z)

H

  1 Harrell also played under her married name of Dorothy Doyle.
  2 Hill also played under her married name of Joyce Westerman.
  3 Holgerson also played under her married name of Margaret Silvestri.

J

K

L

References
 

H